Shatmantamak (Şatmantamaq) is a rural locality (a selo) in Zildyarovsky Selsoviet, Miyakinsky District, Bashkortostan, Russia. The population was 528 as of 2010. There are 7 streets.

Geography 
Shatmantamak is located 38 km southwest of Kirgiz-Miyaki (the district's administrative centre) by road. Yashelkul is the nearest rural locality.

References 

Rural localities in Miyakinsky District